World Relief Germany (formerly PartnerAid International, PAI, current official name: World Relief Deutschland e. V.) is a German-based non-denominational Christian humanitarian organization. The International Office is located in Berlin.

The main focus of its work concentrates on 3 thematic areas: Development-oriented Emergency Aid; Health, Water & Nutrition and Education & Livelihood.

In 2014 the organization joined the World Relief-family, based in the US. PartnerAid International changed their name to World Relief Germany, the PartnerAid sister organizations in Netherlands, Switzerland, United Kingdom and the United States still act under the name of PartnerAid.

Operations 
World Relief Germany partners with people of disadvantaged communities through relief and development assistance, in the three areas as established in 2007: Development-oriented Emergency Aid; Health, Water & Nutrition; and Education & Livelihoods.

World Relief Germany is a signatory to the Code of Conduct for ICRC, The International Red Cross and Red Crescent Movement and NGOs in Disaster Relief, a set of basic professional principles which set standards for good practice in disaster relief.

History 

PartnerAid was first established in 1998 by a group of Christians determined to make an active contribution, and providing aid and assistance on a voluntary basis, to overcome suffering and poverty in the countries of Central and South Asia. In 2014, its name changed to World Relief Germany after partnering with World Relief.

To date World Relief Germany has implemented activities in six countries mainly in the Middle East and is currently operational in Iraq, Jordan, Pakistan, Somaliland, Syria and Yemen. The number of beneficiaries from activities in World Relief Germany's main project locations in 2016 totaled 130.341 in eight countries, with an expenditure totaling €2,340,900.

Organizational structure 

World Relief Germany – World Relief Deutschland e.V. is a registered association recognized as a charity in Germany.

The organizational structure of the association is composed of the General Assembly of Members, the Executive Board and the Supervisory Board. Operational field programmes are directly responsible to the executive board but are supported by the operations department of the International Office.

The staff members of World Relief Germany are either employed staff members or work on a voluntary basis in the International Office or are directly involved in the projects.

Affiliation 
 Deutsch-Jemenitische Gesellschaft (German – Yemeni Society)
 Erlassjahr.de (association of German development policy organizations)
 Gemeinsam gegen Menschenhandel (Together against human trafficking)
 Micha Initiative
 WASH network

Partners

UN Partner 

 UNOCHA – United Nations Office for the Coordination of Humanitarian Affairs
 U.S. Department of State, DRL - Bureau of Democracy, Human Rights and Labor

Government partners 

 AHC - Australian High Commission
 BMZ - German Federal Ministry for Economic Cooperation and Development
 IFA - Institut für Auslandsbeziehungen (with funding from the German Foreign Office)

Other organizations 

 Carsa - Christian action for Reconciliation and Social Assistance
 Diocese of Peshawar
 Mission East
 PartnerAid USA
 Tearfund UK
 World Relief
 Yemeni Red Crescent Society
 ZOA International

References

External links 
 https://www.worldrelief.de/en/

Poverty-related organizations
Christian organisations based in Germany